Central Coast Mariners Football Club is an Australian professional football club based in Gosford, on the Central Coast of New South Wales. The first Asian football match played by the Mariners was against Pohang Steelers on 11 March 2009. They have since participated in the AFC Champions League on four occasions, organised by the Asian Football Confederation. The team has made the knockout stage of Asian competition once (2013).

Qualification for Asian club competitions is determined by a team's position in the domestic league. The winners of the A-League Premiership (regular season) and Championship (finals series) have always qualified, with the next-best team(s) in the A-League regular season occasionally receiving a place.

John Hutchinson holds the club record for most appearances with 24. Adam Kwasnik is the club's record goalscorer in Asian football with three goals. The Mariners' biggest winning margin in Asia is a 5–1 scoreline, this was achieved at home against Tianjin Teda in the 2012 AFC Champions League.

History

2009 AFC Champions League
The Mariners qualified for the 2009 AFC Champions League after finishing first in the 2007–08 A-League regular season. They played their first ever match in Asia against K-League side Pohang Steelers, finishing in a scoreless draw at Central Coast Stadium. In the next match, against Tianjin Teda, Adrian Caceres became the club's first ever goalscorer in Asian football when he deflected a shot from Shane Huke into the goal; the match finished in a 2-all draw. After picking up two points from their first two games, the team had a run of four consecutive losses which saw them eliminated in the group stage.

2012 AFC Champions League
Central Coast returned to Asian competition in the 2012 AFC Champions League after finishing second in the 2010–11 A-League. The club drew their first three matches against Tianjin Teda, Nagoya Grampus and Seongnam Ilhwa Chunma, before suffering a 5-goal loss away to Seongnam. In the following match, against Tianjin Teda, the mariners produced their best-ever Champions League result to date, winning 5–1 at home in what was their first ever win in the competition. Needing an away win in their final group game against Nagoya Grampus to progress to the next round, the club suffered a 3–0 loss and were eliminated from the competition.

2013 AFC Champions League
The Mariners were the only team to receive direct qualification to the 2014 AFC Champions League after winning the 2011–12 A-League Premiership. This campaign included a 2–1 win over Guizhou Renhe, as well as an away win against Suwon Bluewings only two days after winning the 2013 A-League Grand Final. A loss to Kashiwa Reysol in the final group game was not enough to prevent the Mariners from qualifying for the round of sixteen for the first time. In the next round, Central Coast came up against Chinese Super League champions Guangzhou Evergrande and lost 5–1 over two legs. Evergrande went on to win the competition.

2014 AFC Champions League
The club qualified for the 2014 AFC Champions League after winning the 2013 A-League Grand Final, but were forced to deny rumours that they were considering withdrawing from the competition for financial reasons. A double from Mile Sterjovski gave the club a victory over Sanfrecce Hiroshima at home – the Mariners' first victory against Japanese opposition. The club also defeated Beijing Guoan. A loss in their final match against Sanfrecce eliminated the Mariners from the tournament.

2015 AFC Champions League
The Mariners participated in the 2015 AFC Champions League after coming third in the 2013–14 A-League. They entered in the qualifying play-off, where they lost at home to Guangzhou R&F, and were therefore eliminated.

Overall record

By season

By country

See also
 Australian clubs in the AFC Champions League

External links
 Central Coast Mariners official website
 Asian Football Confederation official website

References

Central Coast Mariners FC